Kimonas Xylotympou was a Cypriot association football club based in Xylotympou, located in the Larnaca District. Its stadium is the Xylotymvou Municipality Stadium. It had 7 participations in Cypriot Fourth Division.At 2006 merged with Omonoia Xylotympou to form Podosfairikos Omilos Xylotymbou 2006.

References

Defunct football clubs in Cyprus
Association football clubs established in 1925
1925 establishments in Cyprus
Association football clubs disestablished in 2006